Lee Seung-jae (born 6 April 1982) is a South Korean short track speed skater. He competed in two events at the 2002 Winter Olympics.

References

1982 births
Living people
South Korean male short track speed skaters
Olympic short track speed skaters of South Korea
Short track speed skaters at the 2002 Winter Olympics
Place of birth missing (living people)
Asian Games medalists in short track speed skating
Short track speed skaters at the 1999 Asian Winter Games
Short track speed skaters at the 2003 Asian Winter Games
Medalists at the 2003 Asian Winter Games
Asian Games gold medalists for South Korea
Asian Games silver medalists for South Korea
Asian Games bronze medalists for South Korea
21st-century South Korean people